Don Ignacio Fernando Ramírez de Haro y Pérez de Guzmán, 15th Count of Bornos, G.d.E (20 September 1918 – 24 October 2010), born at San Sebastián, Guipúzcoa, was a Spanish nobleman and the husband of Beatriz Valdés, 4th Marchioness of Casa Valdés.

Ignacio Ramírez de Haro, 15th Count of Bornos and 3rd Marquess of Cazaza in Africa and his wife Beatriz Valdés y Ozores had six children, including Fernando Ramírez de Haro, 16th Count of Bornos and 15th Count of Murillo, who married in 1974 Esperanza Aguirre, a Spanish politician and former President of Madrid. His grandson is Fernando Ramírez de Haro, 10th Marquis of Villanueva de Duero.

He died of legionella at the Hospital Fundación Jiménez Díaz in Madrid on 24 October 2010, aged 92. Ramirez de Haro was buried in the family cemetery in the municipality of Yebes, in the Province of Guadalajara.

Ancestry

Titles and styles

Titles
15th Count of Bornos, Grandee of Spain
14th Count of Murillo, Grandee of Spain -Ceded to his son Don Fernando
9th Marquess of Villanueva del Duero, Grandee of Spain -Ceded to his grandson Don Fernando
18th Marquess of Cazaza in Africa -Ceded to his son Don Ignacio
15th Count of Villariezo -Ceded to his grandson Don Álvaro
12th Count of Montenuevo -Ceded to his son Don Juan

Styles
The Most Illustrious Don Ignacio Ramírez de Haro y Pérez de Guzmán (1918–1952)
The Most Excellent The Marquis of Villanueva del Duero (1952–1973)
The Most Excellent The Count of Bornos (1973–2010)

References

1918 births
2010 deaths
Counts of Spain
Nobility from Madrid
Ignacio Ramirez
Grandees of Spain